, El Al has an all-Boeing fleet composed of the following aircraft:

Former fleet

El Al used to operate the following types of aircraft as well:

 Boeing 707
 Boeing 720
 Boeing 737-200
 Boeing 737-700 
 Boeing 747-100
 Boeing 747-200
 Boeing 747-300
 Boeing 747-400
 Boeing 747-400F
 Boeing 757-200 
 Boeing 767-200ER
 Boeing 767-300ER
 McDonnell Douglas MD-11
 Bristol Britannia
 Curtiss C-46 Commando
 Douglas DC-4
 Lockheed Constellation

References

Boeing aircraft
El Al